Micheldorf Airport is a private use airport located  southwest of  Micheldorf, Upper Austria, Austria.

See also
List of airports in Austria

References

External links 
 Airport record for Micheldorf Airport at Landings.com

Airports in Austria
Upper Austria